Hao Wei (born 30 October 1968) is a Chinese archer. He competed in the men's individual and team events at the 1992 Summer Olympics. He is from Qingdao.

References

1968 births
Living people
Chinese male archers
Olympic archers of China
Archers at the 1992 Summer Olympics
Place of birth missing (living people)
20th-century Chinese people